Jorge Aguilar Cauz is an American businessman of Mexican descent and the former President and current CEO of Encyclopædia Britannica Inc., the publisher of the Encyclopædia Britannica, a position that he was appointed to on May 11, 2021.

Education

Cauz is a graduate of the Kellogg Graduate School of Management of Northwestern University, and prior to joining Britannica, he served as a management consultant for Andersen Consulting and A.T. Kearney.

Britannica career

Cauz was hired by Britannica as a consultant in 1999, and then would later serve a variety of executive positions (including senior vice president of international operations, and chief operating officer of Internet operations) prior to his appointment as president. During that time, he played a key role in the company's marketing strategies, including the publication of all-digital editions of the Encyclopædia Britannica.

One of the key aspects of Cauz's tenure was the emergence of the Internet as both an opportunity and a threat in the encyclopedia business. In a 2000 interview, Cauz remarked that in an Internet-dominated market, "you have to be free to be relevant". Britannica has, in that time, introduced a free (albeit abridged) online version of the encyclopedia, as well as online subscriptions for readers willing to pay for unabridged content. Since his tenure, it is believed that Britannica has succeeded in transitioning its business model into that of a digital publisher and while its revenues are lower, Britannica has been profitable since 2004.

In 2018, Cauz became "an advisor" to Britannica. From 2018 until 2021, he managed a family fund, was a board member of Britannica Knowledge Systems, and a member of the board of the Encyclopaedia Britannica Group.

Britannica and English Wikipedia

During Cauz's tenure, officials from Britannica have become outspoken in their criticism of Wikipedia, which many (including critics) view as a significant competitive threat to Britannica, a threat which Cauz has downplayed. In July 2006, Cauz personally entered the fray in an interview in The New Yorker, in which he stated that Wikipedia would "decline into a hulking, mediocre mass of uneven, unreliable, and, many times, unreadable articles" and that "Wikipedia is to Britannica as American Idol is to the Juilliard School."

In 2008, Cauz stressed that in EB new efforts to participate in online collaboration of encyclopedic content are made, and that recognizing experts is a requirement in order to achieve objectivity and high quality. In April 2008, EB started a project called WebShare, which would "listen to experts" to document knowledge.

In January 2009, Cauz criticized Google for promoting Wikipedia in its search rankings, saying "If I were to be the CEO of Google or the founders of Google I would be very [displeased] that the best search engine in the world continues to provide as a first link, Wikipedia", and "Is this the best they can do? Is this the best that [their] algorithm can do?".

When Britannica announced that they would stop selling their printed encyclopedia in March 2012, Cauz said that "Britannica won’t be able to be as large, but it will always be factually correct.” referencing Wikipedia's larger size.

See also
 Encyclopædia Britannica Eleventh Edition
 Images from Encyclopædia Britannica

References

Encyclopædia Britannica
American chief operating officers
American encyclopedists
Living people
1966 births
Critics of Wikipedia
Kellogg School of Management alumni